This is a list of the members of the fifth Northern Ireland Assembly, the unicameral devolved legislature of Northern Ireland. Members of the Legislative Assembly (MLAs) elected on 5 May 2016 or subsequently co-opted are listed by party and by constituency.

Only the Democratic Unionist Party, Sinn Féin and an Independent Unionist participated in the 4th Northern Ireland Executive, which now comprised nine rather than 12 departments. The Ulster Unionist Party, Social Democratic and Labour Party and Alliance Party declined the roles they were entitled to, and under the Assembly and Executive Reform (Assembly Opposition) Act (Northern Ireland) 2016 the larger UUP and SDLP formed the first official Assembly Opposition.

The Assembly convened on 12 May, electing the DUP's Robin Newton as Speaker.

Party strengths

Graphical representation

MLAs by party 

† Co-opted to replace an elected MLA

‡ Changed affiliation during the term

MLAs by constituency 

† Co-opted to replace an elected MLA
‡ Changed affiliation during the term

Changes since the election

† Co-options

‡ Changes in affiliation

References

External links

 
Lists of members of the Northern Ireland Assembly